Proofpoint may refer to:

 Proofpoint, Inc., an enterprise software security company in Sunnyvale, California, US
 Proofpoint Systems, Inc., a performance software provider in Los Altos, California, US